Anthony "Tony" DeRosa (born January 1, 1959) is an American character animator, best known for his work at Walt Disney Animation Studios. DeRosa has worked as a lead animator on several Disney animated features, including The Lion King, Pocahontas, Hercules, Fantasia 2000, Atlantis: The Lost Empire and The Princess and the Frog. Outside of Disney, DeRosa has worked as an animator on films such as Looney Tunes: Back in Action, Fat Albert, Curious George and The Simpsons Movie, for which he received an Annie Award nomination.

Filmography

References

External links 

Anthony DeRosa Website

American animators
American storyboard artists
Walt Disney Animation Studios people
Living people
1959 births
Animators from Colorado